The 1980–81 season of Bayern Munich started with a 3–0 win against Karlsruher SC and finished up as German champions while being eliminated in the third round of the DFB-Pokal and semi-finals of the European Cup.

Review and events
Bayern Munich won the German championship after finishing the season with 22 wins, 9 draws and 3 losses from 34 matches.

Results

Legend

Bundesliga

DFB-Pokal

European Cup

Qualifying rounds
The first and second rounds were part of the qualifying section.

Knockout rounds

Roster and statistics

Sources

FC Bayern Munich seasons
Bayern
German football championship-winning seasons